Børge Carlo Mathiesen (16 May 1918 – 25 December 1962) was a Danish professional football player. He played 11 games and scored one goal for the Denmark national football team. Mathiesen was a short but strong midfielder with great stamina and a dangerous shot on goal.

Biography
Born in Copenhagen, Mathiesen started his playing career as an amateur with B 1903. He played for the amateur-only Danish national team between 1937 and 1945. As he signed a professional contract in 1947, he was banned from the national team. He moved to France to play for Stade Français. In 1949, he moved to Spain where he played for Atlético Madrid and Racing de Santander. He ended his career in France, playing for Le Havre AC from 1951 to 1953.

Mathiesen died in a car accident on 25 December 1962.

References

1918 births
1962 deaths
Footballers from Copenhagen
Danish men's footballers
Denmark international footballers
Danish expatriate men's footballers
Expatriate footballers in France
Expatriate footballers in Spain
Stade Français (association football) players
Ligue 1 players
Atlético Madrid footballers
Racing de Santander players
La Liga players
Le Havre AC players
Association football midfielders
Danish expatriate sportspeople in France
Danish expatriate sportspeople in Spain